Cannonball is an American game show that aired on the USA Network from July 9 to September 3, 2020. Inspired by the British series of the same name, it featured 16 contestants from across America facing off in a series of water-based obstacle courses to win a cash prize of $10,000.

The series premiered on NBC as a special preview on June 29, 2020. The simulcast was made permanent shortly after, albeit in the form of a slightly edited broadcast television version, after receiving satisfactory response from audience.

Episodes

Production
The series was ordered at the USA network on July 17, 2019, with a 10 episode order. On January 14, 2020, it was announced that The Miz would promulgate the play-by-play, Rocsi Diaz would provide color commentary, and that comedian Simon Gibson would act as the sideline reporter.

Filming on the series took place at the Hansen Dam Recreation Park in Los Angeles, California.

Reception

NBC ratings

References

External links
 
 
 

English-language television shows
USA Network original programming
2020s American game shows
2020 American television series debuts
2020 American television series endings
American television series based on British television series
Television series by ITV Studios
Television shows filmed in Los Angeles
Cannonball (game show)